Aspella helenae is a species of sea snail, a marine gastropod mollusc in the family Muricidae, the murex snails or rock snails.

Description

Distribution

References

 Houart, R. & Tröndle, J., 2008. Update of Muricidae (excluding Coralliophilinae) from French Polynesia with description of ten new species. Novapex 9(2–3): 53–93

Gastropods described in 2008
Aspella